Ara Harutyunyan (March 28, 1928 – February 28, 1999) was an Armenian monumental sculptor, graphic artist, People's Artist of Armenia, corresponding member of Academy of Fine Arts of USSR and  Russian Academy of  Arts, professor.

He is the creator of monumental statue Mother Armenia installed on the heights of Yerevan, which became one of the most popular symbols of Armenia. Harutyunyan revived the traditions of the medieval Armenian architectural and sculptural complex and created his own vivid style of decorative narrative relief art. Among them are such iconic work as the Erebuni Museum, the sculptural complex of the G. Sundukyan State Academic Theatre, the Sardarapat Memorial Complex and the Musa Ler monument, the reliefs of the Yerevan Vine Plant.

The sculptor's artistic legacy is large, and its significance is outstanding. His work is notable by the variety of genres and compositions used, by its versatility and magnitude. Harutyunyan created more than 40 monumental and monumental-decorative works, sculptural complex in Armenia, Russia, France, Italy, Philippines and other countries, as well as reliefs, gravestones, easel sculptures, dozens of drawings and graphic works.

The art scholar A. Kamensky said: "Harutyunyan strongly influenced today's Yerevan. He created its central vertical, the grand "Mother Armenia"  monumental statue. The bas-reliefs and decorative sculptures  done by the master decorate the entrance of the G. Sundukyan Theatre, the Erebuni Museum, the Journalists' House and other buildings. Their architectural and sculptural composition in many ways determines the artistic and plastic expressivity of the modern Yerevan, the language of its symbols and historical associations".

Childhood
Ara Harutyunyan was born on March 28, 1928, in Yerevan. His father was a musician who worked for the Armenian Philharmonics and the A. Spendiaryan opera and ballet Theatre, the artistic director and conductor of which was K. Saradjev. From his early childhood A. Harutyunyan demonstrated an outstanding talent for the arts and a serious interest in sculpture. As a child, he loved theatre and pictorial art, especially the works of M. Vrubel. Once, when he was still a boy, he found a piece of tuff and, using whatever tools he could find, hewed out a woman's head that looked like Armenian goddess Anahit. This work received praise from the artist Taragros, who was very knowledgeable in all that concerned Armenian ornaments and miniatures.

After finishing seventh grade (1943), Harutyunyan entered the Yerevan Art College after F. Terlemezyan. He was a student at the workshop of G. Aharonyan, who introduced his students to the history of the European culture, expanding their knowledge and forming their tastes.

In 1948 two of  Harutyunyan's student works were exhibited in the foyer of the Spendiaryan Theatre  in Yerevan. In 1952  Harutyunyan received the prize of Ministry of Culture of the Armenian SSR for the project of the monument to Anani Shirakatsi.

Mastering creativity
After graduating from the Art College, Harutyunyan entered the Yerevan Art and Theatre Institute and graduated from it with distinction in 1954. The sculptor's graduate work was the bronze statue of Komitas that won the competition and was installed on the composer's grave (Yerevan. Komitas Pantheon).
As the art scholar A. Kamensky put it, "... this way, a great national honour was bestowed on Arutyunyan."

His early works included the bust monuments to V. Belinsky (1957), writer A. Shirvanzade (1958), gravestones for the People's Artist of the Armenian SSR A. Voskanyan (1958),  artist E. Tatevosyan (1961), physician S. Sogomonyan (1962). A milestone for this period is the portrait of Ida Kar (1957), the famous English photographer of Armenian origin.

The Lioness (1958), installed by the road to the medieval monastery of Geghard, was one of the first decorative sculptures in Soviet Armenia.

Adulthood
Since the 1960s, Harutyunyan entered a new and amazingly productive stage in his monumental sculpture work. During this period he created the first sculptural complex in the Soviet Armenia. Thanks to Harutyunyan, Armenia got its first narrative reliefs related to the architecture of the buildings. The art scholar S. Orlov, associate member of the Russian Academy of Arts, wrote: "Harutyunyan transformed the traditions of the ancient oriental monumental sculpture in an artistic and individual way. He created his own vivid and original style".

In 1968-1969 Harutyunyan worked on the Erebuni Museum project (the theme of the bas-reliefs of the main front is "King Argishti and the founders of the city", on the southern front "The Lion Hunt", and on the northern front "God Khaldi"). The sculptural decorations of the Museum are a figural story winding through time, depicting the time of the ancient state of Urartu.

In 1970 Harutyunyan was awarded the Diploma of the Union of Architects of the USSR for his reliefs of the Erebuni Museum. Between 1966 and 1976 he worked on his favourite project - the sculptural complex  of the  G. Sundukyan Armenian State Academic Theatre depicting almost 2,000 years of the history of the Armenian theatre.

The G. Sundukyan Theatre is one of the first large-scale structures in Soviet Armenia combining decorative sculpture and architecture. The complex consists of the main entrance of the theatre, the monument to the dramatist G. Sundukyan (1972) and the bas-relief Sirin (1976). The reliefs of the main entrance of the theatre includes a female figure that symbolizes victory and rebirth, the drama, comedy and wisdom masks, the sign of eternal movement and the lithe dancing figures. On the top right there is a depiction of king Artavasdes II who, in 53 BC, founded the first Armenian theatre in the city of Artashat. To the left in the circular layout is the monument to G. Sundukyan, the writer who founded the school of critical realism in Armenian literature and created the national Eastern Armenian theatre. The sculptural portrait of the dramatist is installed on a pedestal that looks like a theatre stage. The final detail of the complex is the  "Sirin" bas-relief. The fairy-tale bird portrayed in warm ochre-coloured tuff looks like the images seen on the pages of medieval Armenian manuscripts.

Details of Armenian culture and history found their embodiment in the compositions Vahagn the Dragon Fighter (1965) and The Builder Eagle (1966) that flank the northern and southern entrances to Yerevan as well as in the reliefs of the Yerevan Vine Plant Foxes and Fighting the Lion (1961).

In 1960, together with architect V. Sarkisyan, Harutyunyan erected a monument to the heroes of Zangezur in the city of Goris.

In 1964, Harutyunyan was awarded a medal of the Academy of Arts of the USSR for Sayat-Nova spring-monument (1963). This work is considered to be one of the best examples of an architectural and sculptural micro ensemble in urban environment. The choice of snow-white marble as the material for the monument is deeply meaningful. It symbolizes the spiritual and poetic figure of Sayat-Nova. The head of the poet is made as a single piece, his face is elaborated with a chisel. The sculptural composition of the monument is connected to its architectural layout. The rectangular marble blocks form light openings through which we see sunlight falling onto the leaves of the trees. On the upper horizontal plate of the monument, there are reliefs of women's heads in traditional headgear. On the other side there is an image of two eagles symbolizing friendship between the peoples. In the lower right angle, a jet of water is running down a marble groove. The monument to the great Armenian poet Sayat-Nova was opened in Yerevan in 1963, during the celebration of the poet's 250th anniversary. This opening was especially festive; it was attended by the leaders of Armenia and by significant figures representing Armenian art and culture. People read Sayat-Nova's poems aloud, the opening ceremony was accompanied by choral singing.

In 1963 Harutyunyan created the statue called Dawn (Sunrise). The figure of a girl made from hammered aluminum was installed by the Yerevan-Sevan highway. The British photographer Norman Parkinson, who came to Armenia together with his creative team, took a photo of the monument with the model Gerry Hall, and it was published in Vogue UK magazine in 1975 as one of the artist's best works.

In 1967, Harutyunyan implemented one of his main monumental projects, the Mother Armenia monumental statue  that was installed in the Victory Park in Yerevan. It is the largest monument in Armenia: its height together with the pedestal is 54 m, the height of the statue itself, made from hammered copper, is 22 m, and it weighs 22 tons. The distinctive characteristics of the figure – stylized shape of the hands, severe outlines of the clothing, the right hand bent precisely at a straight angle – are, according to Harutyunyan's idea, symbols of the power and strength of this protector figure, the might and magnitude of the Motherland. The monument seems to be a single monolith. The task before the sculptor was all the more complicated since the statue was being created for the already existing pedestal where a monument to Stalin used to stand. This once more demonstrated the professional competence and mastery of Harutyunyan. The outstanding historian A. Z. Manfred, whose works on the history of France were a significant contribution to the study of history, visited Armenia in 1968. In his introduction to the book Napoleon Bonaparte (published in Armenian in 1975) Manfred talks with evident admiration about his impressions of the Mother Armenia monument that "amazes by its impact and artistic significance".

The way the monument became a focus of the architecture of Yerevan city and played a city-forming role was noted by the well-known art scholar A. Kamensky.

Harutyunyan talked about the process of creating the Mother Armenia monument in his interview with the Sovetakan Arvest newspaper. He said that according to his idea the Mother Armenia monument was to become the embodiment of courage, heroism and victory.

In 1968, Harutyunyan created (together with the architect R. Israelyan and the sculptors S. Manasyan and A. Shahinyan), a grand architectural and sculptural complex dedicated to the heroes of the Sardarapat Battle and located 10 km from the city of Armavir, right where in 1918 the Armenians won over the Turkish army. The composition includes the figures of winged oxen, an alley of eagles leading to the Victory wall, the buildings of the refectory and the Ethnography Museum of Armenia.

V. Tseltner says: "Harutyunyan's monumental sculpture, which embodied with incomparable force his favourite heroic theme, keeps moving ahead... His winged horses and the eagle on the Victory wall in the Sardarapat Battle complex are almost heraldic." "The main role in the sculptural composition of the complex belongs to the Victory Wall. The whole nature of its statuary, its figurative language, the principles of construction of the bas-relief compositions demonstrate connection with the previous works by Ara Arutyunyan," notes the art scholar B. Zurabov.

In 1969, the Sardarapat Memorial complex was nominated for the State Prize of the USSR.

In 1976, the Musa Ler memorial by Harutyunyan was erected on a hill near the Musa Ler village in the Armavir region of Armenia commemorating the fight of inhabitants of Armenian villages at the foot of Mount Musa Dag against the Turkish army in 1915. The monument is configured to look like a fortress and there is an image of an eagle on it. The front wall of the construction made from tuff is decorated with bas-reliefs of a warrior and a silhouette of a ship in memory of a French ship that saved the Armenian families that came out of the fortress of death. The documentary Sculptor Ara Harutyunyan includes some rare filming of the sculptor working on the monument.

Harutyunyan paid his respects to the Austrian writer Franz Werfel who wrote Forty Days of Musa Dag, the novel describing these historical events. He donated the sculpture portrait of the writer to the Musa Ler memorial. In 1978 he created the decorative sculpture The Muse from hammered copper. It graces the Journalist House in Yerevan, where the sculptor lived for 25 years.

In 1982, the sculptor brought to life, as the art scholar V. Tseltner put it, "the heroic image he found most attractive", the cast iron monument Glory to Labour ("Workman") installed in  Labour Square in a factory district of Yerevan. The strength of human spirit was embodied in the figure of the workman, powerful and dynamic in its forward-directed movement. The monument to the workman was barbarously demolished in 1997. The fragments of the destroyed monument still have not been found.

The figure of genius composer Komitas serves as a leitmotif of all works of Harutyunyan. Throughout his life in art, the sculptor created many sculptures and graphic works on that theme. In 1988 Harutyunyan  made his dream come true by erecting a monument to Komitas in the park of the Yerevan State Conservatory after Komitas. He spoke about this creative idea in his interview to the Yerekoyan Yerevan newspaper in 1977. The sculptor said: "Komitas for me is the unreachable peak, the epitome of holiness...", "Komitas is always with us, among us."

His legacy includes many sculptures. He created a whole gallery of sculpture portraits of the most famous figures from the Armenian history and culture: writer H. Tumanyan, composer Komitas, director V. Adjemyan, singer L. Zakaryan, People's Artists of the USSR M. Mkrtchyan and S. Sarkisyan, hero of the Soviet Union test pilot R. Kaprielyan, as well as the portrait of the Palestinian sculptor Muna Saudi and several generalized and allegoric images: Fall of Ani ("The Last Sigh"), The Call, The Winner, The Country of Nairi, and Hope.

Harutyunyan was a graphic artist who created drawings that presented, as the art scholar Vladimir Tseltner put it, "a surprisingly significant and varied separate part of the creative work of the sculptor so devoted to his main profession".

His personal exhibitions were held with great success in Moscow, Yerevan and many other cities, and beside sculptures they always included drawings and graphic works such as Theatre, Prayer, and Portrait of an actress, etc. The linear ink drawings are especially masterful, such as Dance, Nude, and A lady and satyrs. The art scholar S. Kaplanova says: "Harutyunyan's drawings are akin to works by Boticelli and Giorgione in  purity and chastity of artist’s view of female body."

From 1974 to 1999, the sculptor was a professor at the Yerevan State Academy of Fine Arts. His students shared their memories of their teacher in the article "Master Ara Harutyunyan as seen by his students."

The artistic significance and value of the artistic legacy of Harutyunyan was noted by leading art scholars including A. Kamensky, V. Tseltner, G. Knabe, R. Abolina, I. Ivanova, A. Strigalev, S. Kaplanova, B. Zurabov, M. Ayvazyan, and S. Orlov.

Main works
 1955. The bronze monument to Komitas installed on the composer's grave. Pantheon. Yerevan
 1958.  Lioness of Geghard. The image of the decorative sculpture Lioness in Geghard is currently used in the design of the famous Armenian cognac brand Great Valley.
 1960. Monument of professor R. Yeolyan. Goris. Armenia
 1961. Obelisk in honor of the soldiers of the 89th Taman Division perished in the Great Patriotic War for the liberation of Sevastopol.
 1961. North facade of Yerevan wine plant. Bas-reliefs. Fight with the lion and Foxes  
 1963. Dawn. The figure is made of aluminum chasing.  Installed on the highway Yerevan-Sevan 
 1963. The monument to Sayat Nova is one of the most famous works by Harutyunyan. The monumental drinking fountain is represented by a wall of white marble blocks, with gaps between them. The head of ashug is as if stepping out of it. One the opposite side there is a relief depicting women of three Transcaucasian nations. Yerevan.
 1964. Monumental drinking fountain Friendship between Yerevan and Carrara. Installed in Yerevan and Carrara (Italy) 
 1964. Monumental drinking fountain Friendship between Armenia and Estonia. Qanaker. Armenia
 1965. Monumental drinking-fountain to the victims of Armenian Genocide of 1915. Yerevan.
 1965. Vahagn the Wishup Fighter. Northern entrance to the city of Yerevan
 1966. Builder-eagle. Southern entrance to the city of Yerevan
 In 1966 Harutyunyan accomplished the portal of Armenian Academic Drama Theatre. The height of portal is 5 meters. From the left side there is a figure of a woman embodying renaissance; above the portal are masks symbolizing drama, comedy, wisdom, the sign of eternal motion, airy female dancing figures and a head of a woman in the national attire. On the right is the head of the king Artavazd II, who created the first Armenian theatre in the city of Ashtarak in 53 BC. In 1976 Harutyunyan finishes working on the sculptural ensemble of the Armenian Academic Theatre named after G. Sundukyan. Monument to G. Sundukyan (1972). Sirin. Basrelief (1976) Yerevan.
 1966. Fight of Vahagn with a dragon. Entrance to the city of Kaphan, Armenia
 In 1967-1968 Harutyunyan creates the sculpture Mother Armenia installed in Yerevan in Victory Park. It is the largest monument in Armenia.
 In 1968 Ara Harutyunyan created the grandiose architectural and sculptural complex, dedicated to the heroes of Sardarapat, located 25 kilometers far from Echmiadzin, in the place where the victory was won by Armenians over the Turkish army. Armenia. (together with the architect R. Israelyan and sculptors S. Manasyan and A. Shahinyan)
 1968–1969. Erebuni Museum (Main facade - Argishty and the founders of the city. Southern facade – Lion hunting, Northern facade – God Haldi.) Yerevan.
 1969 The architectural sculpture Battle of Sardarapat was nominated for the USSR State Prize.
 1969 Monument to the poet H. Hakopyan. Installed in front of the Cultural Center named after S.Kirov. Yerevan
 1974 Fertility. Decorative sculpture. Installed in Kishinev in Friendship Park
 1975 Monument to the heroes of Musa Ler. Installed in the village Musa Ler of Echmiadzin. Armenia
 1977 Awarded the title of People's Artist of the Armenian SSR. Elected as member of the Union of Artists of the USSR
 1977–1978. Creative visit to France due to working on the creation of the monument to Misak Manouchian. Installed in Paris suburb of Ivry-sur-Seine.
 1978 Muse. Decorative sculpture. House of Journalists, Yerevan
 1978 Monument to S. Shaumyan, Stepanavan, Armenia
 1979 Sculptural decoration of the facade of the Cultural Center in Razdan, Armenia.
 1982 Personal exhibition in Yerevan.
 1982 Monument to workers Glory to Labor Yerevan. Dismantled in 1997
 1982 Monument-bust to the poet H. Tumanyan. Installed in Batumi
 1983 Personal exhibition in the Central House of Artists. KrymskiyVal. Moscow
 1986 Was published the monography "Ara Arutyunyan", series "Masters of Soviet art", Moscow. Author B. Zurabov
 1988 Monument to the composer Komitas, installed in the park of the Yerevan State Conservatory
 1989 Sculptural decoration of the children music school after Zare Saakyants in the city of Abovyan. Armenia
 1995 Personal exhibition in the halls of the Academy of Arts of the USSR, Russian Federation. Moscow

Indoor sculptures
 Portrait of a student. 1954. Bronze. Museum of Fine Arts. Kirovakan 
 Komitas. 1954. Marble. 54х47х30. National Gallery of Armenia. Yerevan 
 Poet H. Hakopyan. 1956. Marble. 56х100х50. Museum of M Abegyan. Yerevan 
 Youth.Terracotta 1962.123х60х40. National Gallery of Armenia. Yerevan 
 Youth. Colored gypsum.121х57х35. National Gallery of Armenia. Yerevan 
 Portrait of a People's architect of the USSR R. Israyelyan. 1970. Tufa. Museum of Fine Arts. Kirovakan 
 Country of Nairi. Figure. 1970. Bronze. 55x54x44. State Tretyakov Gallery. Moscow 
 Fertility. Bronze. 1970. Museum of Fine Arts. Kirovakan 
 Komitas. Head. 1972. Marble. 67×30×35 House of Choral Society. Lobby. Yerevan
 Komitas. Figure. 1972. Bronze. House of Choral Society. Yerevan 
 Komitas. Full-length figure. Bronze. Tuf. 1972.63×16×13. State Tretyakov Gallery. Moscow 
 Gabriel Sundukyan. Head. Bronze. 1972. Russian Dramatic Theatre after Stanislavskiy. Lobby. Yerevan 
 Portrait of the producer V. Adjemyan. 1974. Bronze. 34х25х30. National Gallery of Armenia. Yerevan 
 Portrait of R. Kaprielyan, Test pilot and the Hero of the Soviet Union and test pilot. Bronze 1975. 52×33×55. Fund of the International Confederation of Unions of Artists. Moscow 
 Ripsime. Figure. Bronze. 1976. 33х18х8  
 Frantz Werphel. Head. 1976. Gypsum. Museum of the architectural complex of Musa Ler. Echmiadzin district 
 Plea (Prayer) Bronze and stone. 58х25х25. Fund of the International Confederation of Unions of Artists. Moscow 
 Thinker. Figure. 1978. Bronze, artificial stone. 68х28х48. State Tretyakov Gallery. Moscow 
 Winner. 1978. Bronze. 74х39х16. National Gallery of Armenia. Yerevan 
 Collapse of Ani. 1978. Bronze. 25х46х22. State Tretyakov Gallery. Moscow 
 Portrait of the daughter Susanna. Marble. 1978. 45, 5x32x48, 5. Fund of the International Confederation of Unions of Artists. Moscow 
 Call. Bronze. 1978. 55х74х30. State Tretyakov Gallery. Moscow 
 Portrait of People's artist of the Armenian SSR F. Mkrtchyan. 1979. Bronze. 38х29х32. State Tretyakov Gallery. Moscow 
 Portrait of the Doctor K. Karagulyan. 1980. Bronze. 36x33x30 
 Portrait of H. Liloyan. 1980. Bronze. 36x21x30 
 Portrait of L. Nersesyan. 1980. Bronze. 35х25х30. 
 Portrait of the singer L. Zaqaryan. 1980. Marble. 41х50х30
 Winegrower. 1980. Bronze. 37,5х15х19. National Gallery of Armenia. Yerevan 
 Portrait of Ruzan. 1980. Terracotta 33х23х23 
 Portrait of the Palestinian sculptor Muna Saudi. 1982. Bronze. 48x29x32. Fund of the International Confederation of Unions of Artists. Moscow 
 Portrait of People's Artist of the Armenian SSR Sos Sargsyan. 1982. Bronze. 36х25х29.
 Fertility. Bronze. 1983. 64х28х28. Museum of Fine Arts. Kirovakan 		
 Hope. Bronze. 1984. 93х38х28.
 Portrait of Academician G. Brutyan. 1984. Marble. 40х58х29 
 Komitas. Bronze. 26х25х28. Museum of Komitas. Yerevan 
 Kara-Murza. Gypsum. 45х160х40. National Gallery of Armenia. Yerevan 
 Hatsagorts Adalyan. Colored gypsum. 50х50х30. Union of Artists. Armenia 
 Mesrop Mashtots. Gypsum. 109х55х25. Resort and spa management. Yerevan
 Architect Trdat. Bronze. 79х24,5х34. Fund of the International Confederation of Unions of Artists. Moscow 
 Portrait of the President of Philippines Corazon Aquino. 1988. Bronze. Installed in the Malacanang Palace, Manila, Philippines.

Awards
 1952 received the prize of Ministry of Culture of the Armenian SSR for the project of the monument to Anani Shirakatsi
 1955 became a member of the Artists' Union of Armenia SSR and USSR
 1955-1966 taught at the Yerevan Art College after F. Terlemezyan
 1959 participated in a cruise around the Europe as a member of Soviet artists delegation
 1964 was awarded a medal of the Academy of Arts of the USSR for the spring monument "Sayat- Nova" in Yerevan; was awarded a title of Honored Artist of the Armenian SSR
 1964 was elected as a member of the Council of the Artists’ Union Armenian SSR
 1965 participated in the 4th International exhibition of sculptures in Carrara, Italy
 1970 was awarded the Diploma of the Union of Architects of the USSR for reliefs of the Erebuni Museum
 1972 was awarded the title of Honored Worker of Arts of the Armenian SSR; had a creative journey to Italy as a member of USSR Academy of Arts delegation
 1974 had a creative journey to UK as the head of the USSR c Artists delegation
 1974-1999 taught at the Yerevan State Academy of Fine Arts
 1977 was awarded the title People's Artist of Armenia; was elected as Board member of the Union Artists of the USSR
 1977-1978 had a visit to France due to working on the creation of the monument to Missak Manouchian and participating in the opening ceremony
 1988 was elected as a corresponding member of the Academy of Arts of the USSR; became a professor
 1988 had a creative journey to Malaysia, Singapore, Philippines; was awarded the Order of Friendship of Peoples.

Figures

Notes

External links

 Official page
 March 28 is the birthday of sculptor Ara Harutyunyan

Sources
 Ara Harutyunyan's biography
 Сергей Орлов. Творческий вечер памяти профессора А. А. Арутюняна. Портал современной российской скульптуры. Объединение Московских Скульпторов. 2013 г.
 Ара Арутюнян.Б.Зурабов.Советский художник.М.,1986

1928 births
1999 deaths
20th-century Armenian painters
Artists from Yerevan
Armenian sculptors